Samir Haouam (born 1 July 1968) is a retired Algerian athlete specialising in the hammer throw. He won multiple medals at the continental level, including the gold at the 2000 African Championships.

His personal best in the event is 71.28 metres from 2001 and Algerian record holder.

Competition record

References

1968 births
Living people
Algerian male hammer throwers
African Games silver medalists for Algeria
African Games medalists in athletics (track and field)
African Games bronze medalists for Algeria
Athletes (track and field) at the 1999 All-Africa Games
Athletes (track and field) at the 2003 All-Africa Games
Athletes (track and field) at the 2007 All-Africa Games
Athletes (track and field) at the 2001 Mediterranean Games
Mediterranean Games competitors for Algeria
21st-century Algerian people
20th-century Algerian people